The German Open is an annual badminton tournament held in Germany since 1955 (as West Germany) and organized by German Badminton Association or Deutscher Badminton Verband (DBV). The tournaments were not held in the year 1970, 1979 and 1998.

Known as German Badminton Championships until 1980, the tournament was later allowed to be known as Open Championships from 1981 on. The tournament is currently sponsored by Yonex. While it does attract professional players, the event is not part of the highest levels of Badminton World Federation tournaments – being classified as a BWF Grand Prix Gold event until 2017, and a Super 300 tournament (6th level) from 2018 on.

Host cities

 1955–1962: Bonn
 1963, 1969: Hamburg
 1964: Lübeck
 1965: Bochum
 1966: Hanover
 1967: Frankfurt
 1968: West Berlin
 1970: not held
 1971–1974, 1978: Oberhausen
 1975–1977, 1980–1982, 2005–present: Mülheim an der Ruhr
 1979: not held
 1983–1986, 1999–2004: Duisburg
 1987–1991: Düsseldorf
 1992–1995: Leverkusen
 1996–1997: Saarbrücken
 1998: not held

Past winners

Performances by nation

Full list
List of German Open Women's singles champions

References

External links

Official website 
Official website 
Badminton.de: German Open

 
Badminton tournaments in Germany
Recurring sporting events established in 1955
1955 establishments in Germany